John C. Schober (born June 25, 1951) is an American lawyer and politician.

Born in Waukesha, Wisconsin, Schober graduated from New Berlin High School in New Berlin, Wisconsin. He received his bachelor's degree from Marquette University and his J.D. degree from Marquette University Law School. Schober practiced law in New Berlin and village attorney for Big Bend, Wisconsin. Schober served on the New Berlin Common Council and was president of the council. In the April 1982 special election, Schober was elected to the Wisconsin State Assembly as a Republican and then served until 1989.

Notes

1951 births
Living people
Politicians from Waukesha, Wisconsin
Marquette University alumni
Marquette University Law School alumni
Wisconsin lawyers
Wisconsin city council members
People from New Berlin, Wisconsin
Republican Party members of the Wisconsin State Assembly